Pleasant Street may refer to:

Pleasant Street incline, a former subway portal in Boston
Pleasant Street station (BERy), a former rapid transit station located at the portal
Pleasant Street station (MBTA), a former light rail station in Boston
Pleasant Street station (BRB&L), a former station on the Boston, Revere Beach and Lynn Railroad in Winthrop, Massachusetts
Pleasant Street station (B&M), a former station on the Boston and Maine Railroad Stoneham Branch in Stoneham, Massachusetts
 Pleasant Street Congregational Church, a historic church in Arlington, Massachusetts, United States
 Pleasant Street (Yarmouth, Maine), a street in Yarmouth, Maine, U.S.

See also

 Pleasant Street Historic District (disambiguation)
 Pleasant Street School (disambiguation)